The Presiding Officer of the Tobago House of Assembly is elected by the assembly members and presides over all Sittings of the assembly.

The current Presiding Officer of the Tobago House of Assembly is Abby Taylor of the Progressive Democratic Patriots.

List of Presiding Officers

List of Deputy Presiding Officers

See also
 Chief Secretary of Tobago
 List of Presiding Officers of the Tobago House of Assembly
 Local government in Trinidad and Tobago
 Politics of Trinidad and Tobago
 Presiding Officer (disambiguation page)
 Tobago House of Assembly

References

External links
 Tobago House of Assembly

Tobago House of Assembly
Tobago
Tobago
List
Politics of Trinidad and Tobago
Lists of political office-holders in Trinidad and Tobago
Government of Trinidad and Tobago
Tobago